The Hal W. Adams Bridge, built in 1947, is a historic bridge that carries State Road 51 across the Suwannee River between Lafayette and Suwannee counties, Florida in the United States. Located 3 miles north of Mayo, it was the first suspension bridge built in Florida, and the only one to carry highway traffic. At its opening on July 4, 1947, it was named for Hal W. Adams of Mayo, former county judge of Lafayette County and then longtime circuit judge for the circuit encompassing Lafayette and Suwannee counties.

In 1989, the Hal W. Adams Bridge was listed in A Guide to Florida's Historic Architecture, published by the University of Florida Press.

Gallery

See also
 List of crossings of the Suwannee River

References

Suspension bridges in the United States
Adams
Transportation buildings and structures in Lafayette County, Florida
Road bridges in Florida
Bridges over the Suwannee River
Towers in Florida
Bridges completed in 1947
1947 establishments in Florida